The 2005 Formula BMW ADAC season was a multi-event motor racing championship for open wheel, formula racing cars held across Europe. The championship featured drivers competing in 1.2 litre Formula BMW single seat race cars. The 2005 season was the eighth Formula BMW ADAC season organized by BMW Motorsport and ADAC.

Nico Hülkenberg was crowned series champion.

Teams and drivers
 All cars are powered by BMW engines, and Mygale FB02 chassis.

Calendar

Standings
Points are awarded as follows:

† — Drivers did not finish the race, but were classified as they completed over 90% of the race distance.

Rookie Cup
Points are awarded as follows:

External links
 Formula BMW ADAC 2005 on adac-motorsport.de

Formula BMW seasons
Formula BMW ADAC
BMW ADAC